The 2015–16 Moldovan Women's Cup is the 18th edition of the Moldovan annual football tournament. The competition began on 14 October 2015 with the preliminary round and will end with the final held in May 2016.

Quarterfinals
Matches took place on 14 October and 4 November 2015.

Semifinals

FINAL

References

External links
Official website

Moldovan Women's Cup seasons
Moldovan Women's Cup 2015-16
Moldova